David Melvyn Linden (born 14 May 1990) is a Scottish National Party (SNP) politician serving as the Member of Parliament (MP) for Glasgow East since 2017. He served as the SNP Spokesperson for Work and Pensions from 2021 to 2022 and the Spokesperson for Housing, Communities and Local Government in the House of Commons from 2020 to 2021.

Early life
Linden was born on 14 May 1990 in Glasgow, Scotland. He grew up in Cranhill and Garrowhill in the East End of Glasgow. He was educated at Milncroft Primary School (closed in 2004 and replaced by Cranhill Primary), Garrowhill Primary School and then Bannerman High School in Baillieston. He left school at the age of 16 and undertook an apprenticeship in Business Administration with Glasgow City Council. He worked for Glasgow Credit Union for two years.

Political career
He was the national convenor for the youth wing of the Scottish National Party (SNP), SNP Youth and campaigned for Scottish independence in the 2014 referendum. Linden worked as a researcher for John Mason MSP for Glasgow Shettleston. Between 2015 and 2017, he worked as a parliamentary assistant for Alison Thewliss, MP for Glasgow Central.

At the 2017 general election, the incumbent MP for Glasgow East, Natalie McGarry, was not reselected by the SNP. Linden was instead selected as the candidate for the seat. He was elected, with a narrow majority of just 75 votes over Kate Watson of the Labour Party.

Linden voted for the United Kingdom (UK) to remain within the European Union (EU) in the 2016 UK EU membership referendum. In the indicative votes on 27 March 2019, he voted for a referendum on a Brexit withdrawal agreement.

At the 2019 general election, Linden was re-elected with an increased majority of 5,566.

At Westminster, Linden chairs the All-Party Parliamentary Group on Premature and Sick Babies as well as the All-Party Parliamentary Group on Nutrition for Growth.

In November 2020, Linden was reprimanded for using tax payers money to send 200 birthday cards to children turning 18, using prepaid envelopes embossed with a Westminster logo. A Parliament inquiry said he had used them to promote himself and ordered  him to pay back £147.34 in postage. Linden admitted he had breached the parliamentary code of conduct.

Defence Secretary Ben Wallace accused a delegation of MPs, amongst whom David Linden, of conduct that "put military personnel in a difficult position" after drinking in an airport departure lounge and once in the air during a visit to Gibraltar-based soldiers. They were also accused of being rude to airport staff. An SNP spokesman refuted these allegations describing them as "false".

Personal life
Linden is the father to two children with his first wife Roslyn, whom he married in 2012. As of September 2021, Linden was in a relationship with Labour Party MP Cat Smith.

In his spare time, Linden likes to fish and is a fan of Airdrieonians Football Club.

References

External links
 Profile on SNP website
 

1990 births
Living people
People from Cranhill
Scottish National Party MPs
UK MPs 2017–2019
UK MPs 2019–present
Members of the Parliament of the United Kingdom for Glasgow constituencies
Politicians from Glasgow